Pukeuria is a genus of very small sea snails, pyramidellid gastropod mollusks or micromollusks. This genus is currently placed in the subfamily Chrysallidinae of the family Odostomiidae.

Shell description
The original genus description, and the description of the type species (Laws 1941) can be found at:

Life history
Nothing is known about the biology of the members of this genus. As is true of most members of the Pyramidellidae sensu lato, they are most likely to be ectoparasites.

Species
Species within the genus Pukeuria include:
 Pukeuria anaglypta Laws, 1941 (Type species)

References

External links 
 Pukeura  anaglypta illustration of type species

Pyramidellidae
Gastropods of New Zealand

de:Pyramidelloidea